National Highway 152 (NH 152) is a  National Highway in India.

See also 
 List of highways in Haryana
 Haryana Roadways
 Haryana Tourism
 National Highway Authority of India
 Railway in Haryana

References

National highways in India
National Highways in Haryana